Åse Idland (born April 2, 1973, in Stavanger) is a retired Norwegian biathlete.

Career 
World Championships
1994 Canmore - Silver medal in the team competition

External links 
 
 
 
 

1973 births
Norwegian female biathletes
Olympic biathletes of Norway
Biathletes at the 1992 Winter Olympics
Living people
Biathlon World Championships medalists
Sportspeople from Stavanger